Peracarpa is a genus of flowering plants belonging to the family Campanulaceae.

Its native range is Russian Far East to Tropical Asia. 

Peracarpa is part of Peracarpeae, a small tribe with three genera: Homocodon, Heterocodon and Peracarpa. The systemic position of the Peracarpa is unclear since it has not been sampled within phylogenetic studies.

Species
Species:
 Peracarpa carnosa (Wall.) Hook.f. & Thomson

References

Campanuloideae
Campanulaceae genera